OpenHPC is a set of community-driven FOSS tools for Linux based HPC.   OpenHPC does not have specific hardware requirements.

History
A birds-of-a-feather panel discussion titled "Community Supported HPC Repository & Management Framework" convened at the 2015 edition of the International Supercomputing Conference. The panel discussed the common software components necessary to build linux compute clusters and solicited feedback on community interest in such a project. Following the response, the OpenHPC project was announced at SC 2015 under the auspices of the Linux Foundation.

Releases

Design
OpenHPC provides an integrated and tested collection of software components that, along with a supported standard Linux distribution, can be used to implement a full-featured compute cluster. Components span the entire HPC software ecosystem including provisioning and system administration tools, resource management, I/O services, development tools, numerical libraries, and performance analysis tools.  The architecture of OpenHPC is intentionally modular to allow end users to pick and choose from the provided components, as well as to foster a community of open contribution. The project provides recipes for building clusters using CentOS (v8.3) and openSUSE Leap (v15.2) on x86_64 as well as aarch64 architectures.

See also

 Cluster manager
 Comparison of cluster software
 List of cluster management software

References

External links
 OpenHPC: A Comprehensive System Software Stack
 Next Platform – OpenHPC Pedal Put To The Compute Metal
 HPCwire – OpenHPC Pushes to Prove its Openness and Value at SC16
 High Performance Computing: 32nd International Conference
 OpenHPC Slack channel

Cluster computing
High-availability cluster computing
Job scheduling
Parallel computing